The Coliseum–Duplex Envelope Company Building, also known as the Valentine Auction Company Building, is a building in Richmond, Virginia that was built in 1922 in Early Commercial style.

It was listed on the National Register of Historic Places in 1999.  It is located in the West Broad Street Commercial Historic District.

References

Industrial buildings and structures on the National Register of Historic Places in Virginia
National Register of Historic Places in Richmond, Virginia
Buildings designated early commercial in the National Register of Historic Places
Buildings and structures in Richmond, Virginia
Commercial buildings completed in 1922
Individually listed contributing properties to historic districts on the National Register in Virginia
Envelopes